John Weis may refer to:
 John Weis (politician), member of the Ohio House of Representatives
 John Ellsworth Weis, American painter

See also
 John Weiss, American author and clergyman